Salenside is a village off the A7, on the Ale Water, near Ashkirk, in the Scottish Borders area of Scotland, in the former Selkirkshire. There was a Salenside Tower house, but nothing remains of it. Salenside Farm and Salenside Cottage exist. The placenames Selkirk and Salenside are related.

Other places nearby include Appletreehall, Essenside, Hawick, Lilliesleaf, Philiphaugh, and Woll.

See also
List of places in the Scottish Borders

References
 Morris and Morris, R and F (1982) 'Scottish healing wells: healing, holy, wishing and fairy wells of the mainland of Scotland, Sandy, page 175, held at RCAHMS G.2.4.MOR

External links
CANMORE/RCAHMS record of Cold Well, 175m east of Salenside
RCAHMS record of Salenside Tower
Scottish Assessors Association: Salenside Shiel, selkirk, Scottish Borders
Scottish Assessors Association: Salenside Tower, Selkirk

Villages in the Scottish Borders